Claydon is an unincorporated community within the Rural Municipality of Frontier No. 19, Saskatchewan, Canada. The community is located 60 km southeast of the community of Robsart, 50 km south of the town of Eastend, and 31 km West of Frontier, Saskatchewan on Highway 18. Very little remains of the former community: only a post office that was also formerly a grocery store, a community hall, and ball diamonds.

Education

Claydon no longer has a school, but those who live in or near Claydon are now bused to the neighboring village of Frontier which has a school that covers Kindergarten to Grade 12 serving approximately 200 students.

Climate

See also 

 List of communities in Saskatchewan
 List of ghost towns in Canada
 Ghost towns in Saskatchewan

References 

Frontier No. 19, Saskatchewan
Populated places established in 1917
Unincorporated communities in Saskatchewan
Ghost towns in Saskatchewan
Division No. 4, Saskatchewan